The men's 100 metre backstroke event at the 2018 Asian Games took place on 19 August at the Gelora Bung Karno Aquatic Stadium.

Schedule
All times are Western Indonesia Time (UTC+07:00)

Records

Results

Heats

Final

References

External links
Official website

Swimming at the 2018 Asian Games